This is a list of islands of Guinea-Bissau.

Bissagos Islands 
Bubaque 
Bolama
Carache
Caravela
Enu
Formosa
Galinhas
João Vieira
Maio
Meneque
Orango
Orangozinho
Poilão
Ponta
Roxa
Rubane 
Soga
Unhacomo
Uno
Uracane

Other islands 
Elia Island
Jeta
Lisboa Island
Melo Island
Mosquitos Island
Ocurri Island (Mantambua)
Ongueringao Island
Pecixe
Seco Island

References
Mapa do Arquipélago dos Bijagós

See also 
 Geography of Guinea-Bissau

Islands
 
Guinea-Bissau